Elliot Slessor (born 4 August 1994) is an English professional snooker player.

In May 2013, Slessor qualified for the 2013–14 and 2014–15 professional Main Tour as one of four semi-finalists from the first Q School event.

Career
Slessor began playing snooker at the age of eight after his aunt bought him a table for Christmas. He joined the main snooker tour in May 2013 after he won through Qualifying School courtesy of a 4–0 victory over Chris Wakelin.

2013/2014 season
Slessor's first wins as a professional were at the qualifying rounds of the 2013 Australian Goldfields Open 5–4 against Jamie Clarke and 5–2 against Cao Yupeng, before losing 5–2 to Simon Bedford. His debut at the main stage of a ranking event came at the Indian Open by seeing off Kurt Maflin 4–2. In New Delhi he lost 4–2 to Mark Davis. Slessor also suffered first round exits at the UK Championship and Welsh Open 6–2 to Liang Wenbo and 4–1 to Stephen Maguire respectively. He finished his first season on tour ranked world number 112.

2014/2015 season
Slessor automatically played in the opening rounds of the UK Championship and Welsh Open, where he was knocked out 6–4 by David Gilbert and 4–3 by Jamie Cope. He qualified for the China Open by coming back from 3–1 down against Xiao Guodong to win 5–4. He then raced into a 3–0 lead over Matthew Selt and held on to beat him 5–3 and play in the last 32 of a ranking event for the first time in his career. Slessor faced reigning world champion Mark Selby and was thrashed 5–0. He played in Q School to try and win his place back on the tour as he finished the season as the world number 91. Slessor was beaten in the third round of the first event 4–1 by Oliver Brown and was docked three frames in the second round of event two after arriving late and went on to lose 4–1 against Alex Taubman.

2015/2016 season
Slessor played in five of the six European Tour events and reached the main draw in all of them. His only win came against Liang Wenbo 4–0 at the Gdynia Open, before losing 4–1 to Robin Hull in the second round. Slessor gained a two-year tour card starting in the 2016–17 season after coming through qualifying from the EBSA Play-Offs at the end of the 2015–16 season. Slessor beat Jamie Clarke 4–3 in the final round.

2016/2017 season
Slessor got to the second round of four ranking events in the 2016–17 season, but lost all of them. This did include a 4–3 victory over home favourite Mark Williams in the opening round of the Welsh Open, where Slessor made a break of 90 in the final frame.

2017/2018 season
In Indian Open, Slessor got to the quarter-final, by beating Alan McManus 4–3, Joe Perry 4–3, by leading 3–0, Shaun Murphy 4–1, before losing Mark King 2–4.
Slessor got his best ranking finish in his career in the Northern Ireland Open. He beat Ronnie O'Sullivan in the third round by 4–1, before losing 2–6 by Mark Williams.

Performance and rankings timeline

References

External links

Elliot Slessor at worldsnooker.com

English snooker players
Living people
1994 births
Sportspeople from Gateshead